Mark Rogers may refer to:

Mark E. Rogers (1952–2014), American author and illustrator
Mark Rogers (baseball) (born 1986), American former baseball pitcher
Mark Rogers (soccer) (born 1975), Canadian former soccer player
Mark Rogers, lead singer and songwriter of British band Hollywood Beyond
Mark Rogers, United Future New Zealand candidate in the Aoraki electorate
Mark C. Rogers (born 1942), American pediatrician, cardiologist, and anesthesiologist

See also
Marc Rogers, Canadian bassist